Gregory Messam (born 24 July 1973) is a Jamaican football defender.

Playing career 
Nicknamed 'Skippy', the solid left-back played for local teams Arnett Gardens F.C. and Olympic Gardens F.C., and has played overseas for Richmond Kickers, then of the USA A-League.

During 1996, Messam played for the Colorado Foxes in the A-League, where he played alongside fellow Jamaican internationals Walter Boyd, Wolde Harris, Fabian Davis, and Anthony McCreath under the direction of head coach Lorne Donaldson. In 2001, he went north of the border to sign with the Toronto Lynx, and featured in 13 matches and recorded one goal. After his stint in Toronto he returned to Jamaica to play with Arnett Gardens F.C. After three seasons in Jamaica he returned to the Toronto Lynx in 2004, but was released after making a single appearance. After his release he signed with the Metro Lions of the Canadian Professional Soccer League. During his tenure with the Lions he helped secure a postseason berth by finishing second in the Eastern Conference.

International career 
He made his debut as a substitute for the Reggae Boyz in 1995 against Canada and played his last international in 1998 against Trinidad & Tobago, collecting over 30 caps. Messam was a regular starter at left wingback during the early rounds of Jamaica's successful World Cup qualifying effort in 1998. He unfortunately was left out of Jamaica's 1998 FIFA World Cup squad in favour of Ricardo Gardner, but he was however allowed to accompany the team in France.

References

1973 births
Living people
Jamaican footballers
Jamaica international footballers
Arnett Gardens F.C. players
Colorado Foxes players
Harbour View F.C. players
Brampton United players
Richmond Kickers players
Toronto Lynx players
Jamaican expatriate footballers
Expatriate soccer players in the United States
Expatriate soccer players in Canada
Jamaican expatriate sportspeople in Canada
Jamaican expatriate sportspeople in the United States
Canadian Soccer League (1998–present) players
A-League (1995–2004) players
1998 CONCACAF Gold Cup players
Association football defenders
National Premier League players